Kincardine O'Neil is a village in Aberdeenshire, Scotland. It is situated between the towns of Banchory and Aboyne approximately 25 miles (40 km) west of Aberdeen on the north bank of the River Dee.

Etymology

The village was formerly known as Eaglais Iarach (Church of St Irchard/Erchard) in Scots Gaelic.

The O'Neil suffix is likely to originate from the ancient Barony of Onele/O'Neill which was gifted to Donnchadh IV, Earl of Fife by Robert the Bruce in 1315.

Area history
Since ancient times there was a crossing of the Dee River at Kincardine O'Neil.  Locations of the Dee crossings along with alignment of ancient trackways formed a major impetus for location of early castles and settlements. In the vicinity of Kincardine O'Neil the Middle Ages trackways to the south had a particular influence on development in and around Kincardine O'Neil and Aboyne Castle.

Saint Irchard, a medieval bishop of the Picts, was born in Kincardine O'Neil.

In the 19th century, the Deeside Railway bypassed the village, impeding the expansion of the settlement, unlike towns nearby. By 1895 the population of Kincardine O'Neil exceeded 200. Most of the extant buildings were built in the 19th century.

The village was designated a conservation area in 1983 and subsequently granted 'outstanding' status in 1995.

Amenities
Kincardine O'Neil is home to a number of shops and services including a traditional village store and post office.  The village hall, bowling green and playing field are to the west end of the settlement. There is a curling pond behind the north side of the main street. There is a Scottish Episcopal Church and a primary school. Public toilets are maintained by the local community.  The Deeside Way passes through the village.

People associated with Kincardine O'Neil
 John Henry Anderson
 Margaret Bane
 Bill Bradford (British Army officer)
 James Grant Duff
 David Dumbreck
 Alan Durward
 Irchard
 Peter Milne (musician)
 Thomas Reid
 Alexander Ross (poet)

Sister cities
  Thun-Saint-Martin, France

See also
 Kincardine Castle, Royal Deeside
 Kincardine O'Neil Hospital, Aberdeenshire

Line notes

References
 C. Michael Hogan, Elsick Mounth, Megalithic Portal, ed A. Burnham 
 John Mackintosh, History of the Valley of the Dee, from the Earliest Times to the Present Day, 1895, Taylor and Henderson, 240 pages
 Kincardine O'Neil historical profile

External sources

 Kincardine O'Neil Homepage

Villages in Aberdeenshire